Walter Campbell Allison Aitkenhead (21 May 1887 – 19 July 1966) was a Scottish footballer who played for Partick Thistle, Blackburn Rovers and the Scotland national team.

Aitkenhead was born in Maryhill, Glasgow and played just 4 matches for his first club Partick Thistle before being signed by English club Blackburn Rovers in September 1906. He remained with Blackburn for the remainder of his career, winning the 1911-12 and 1913-14 league championships. He made just one appearance for Scotland, and scored twice in a 4–1 win against Ireland on 16 March 1912.

During the First World War he "guested" for Preston North End for several seasons. After retiring in 1918 he worked at management level in the Lancashire cotton industry, serving as chairman of a local firm for almost 40 years.

References

External links

1887 births
1966 deaths
Scottish footballers
Scotland international footballers
Partick Thistle F.C. players
Blackburn Rovers F.C. players
English Football League players
Association football forwards
Footballers from Glasgow
Preston North End F.C. wartime guest players
Place of death missing